Sinoennea is a genus of air-breathing land snails, terrestrial pulmonate gastropod mollusks in the family Diapheridae.

Etymology

Distribution
The distribution of Sinoennea includes South of India, Indochina, China (South of Yangtze River and Taiwan), Malaysian Peninsula in Malaysia and Thailand, Sumatra, Japan and South Korea.

Description
The shell of Sinoennea has 6-7 whorls. The whorls are swelling.

Taxonomy
This genus used to belong to the families Streptaxidae and Diapheridae, but the newest assigned it to the Family Enneinae.

Species
Species in the genus Sinoennea include:
 
 Sinoennea angustistoma Páll-Gergely, A. Reischütz & Maassen, 2020
 Sinoennea apicata van Benthem Jutting, 1961
 Sinoennea atomaria (Dautzenberg, 1894)
 Sinoennea attenuata van Benthem Jutting, 1961
 Sinoennea austeni (Peile, 1929)
 Sinoennea bacca van Benthem Jutting, 1961
 Sinoennea baculum van Benthem Jutting, 1961
 Sinoennea bhucylindrica E. Gittenberger & Leda, 2021
 Sinoennea blanfordiana (Godwin-Austen, 1872)
 Sinoennea butleri (Peile, 1929)
 Sinoennea callizonus van Benthem Jutting, 1961
 Sinoennea calva (Dautzenberg, 1894)
 Sinoennea cava (Pilsbry & Hirase, 1908)
 Sinoennea charasensis Tomlin, 1941
 Sinoennea chintamanensis Tomlin, 1941
 Sinoennea chrysallis van Benthem Jutting, 1961
 Sinoennea copiaensis Do Duc Sang & Do Van Nhuong, 2015
 Sinoennea crumenilla van Benthem Jutting, 1961
 Sinoennea dactylus van Benthem Jutting, 1961
 Sinoennea densecostata (O. Boettger, 1892)
 Sinoennea duplicaria (Pilsbry, 1926) 
 Sinoennea euryomphala Inkhavilay & Panha, 2016
 Sinoennea fartoidea (Theobald, 1870)
 Sinoennea fuchsi (Gredler, 1885)
 Sinoennea fuzhouensis W.-C. Zhou, D.-N. Chen & J-X. Guo, 2006
 Sinoennea glebula van Benthem Jutting, 1961
 Sinoennea guiyangensis T.-C. Luo, D.-N. Chen & G.-Q. Zhang, 1998
 Sinoennea hippocrepis (Bavay & Dautzenberg, 1912)
 Sinoennea hungerfordiana (Möllendorff, 1887)
 Sinoennea infantilis Páll-Gergely & Grego, 2020
 Sinoennea insularis (Minato, 1974)
 Sinoennea irregularis (Möllendorff, 1900)
 Sinoennea iwakawa (Pilsbry, 1900)
 Sinoennea iwakawa yakushimae
 Sinoennea kanchingensis Tomlin, 1948
 Sinoennea karnekampi Maassen, 1999
 Sinoennea kennethi Vermeulen, 2007
 Sinoennea kermorganti (Ancey, 1881)
 Sinoennea kwangsiensis Yen, 1939
 Sinoennea larvula (Heude, 1882)
 Sinoennea latens Peile, 1935
 Sinoennea lembingensis Tomlin, 1941
 Sinoennea lenggongensis Tomlin, 1939
 Sinoennea lepida van Benthem Jutting, 1961
 Sinoennea leucostolos van Benthem Jutting, 1961
 Sinoennea lizae Maassen, 2008
 Sinoennea ljudmilena Páll-Gergely, 2020
 Sinoennea loeiensis Tanmuangpak & S. Tumpeesuwan, 2015
 Sinoennea longtangshanensis Zhang et al., 2015
 Sinoennea macrodonta (Bavay & Dautzenberg, 1912)
 Sinoennea malaccana (Möllendorff, 1902)
 Sinoennea manyunensis B. Fan, M. Tian & Y.-X. Chen, 2014
 Sinoennea maolanensis T.-C. Luo, W.-C. Zhou & D.-N. Chen, 2004
 Sinoennea menglunensis P. Wang, Y-J. Chen, W.-C. Zhou & C.-C. Hwang, 2015
 Sinoennea micropleuris (Möllendorff, 1887)
 Sinoennea milium (Godwin-Austen, 1876)
 Sinoennea miyakojimana (Pilsbry & Hirase, 1904)
 Sinoennea moerchiana (G. Nevill, 1881)
 Sinoennea montawana Páll-Gergely & Hunyadi, 2020
 Sinoennea nagaensis (W. T. Blanford, 1899)
 Sinoennea nimai E. Gittenberger & Gyeltshen, 2021
 Sinoennea otostoma Páll-Gergely, A. Reischütz & Maassen, 2020
 Sinoennea pagodella van Benthem Jutting, 1961
 Sinoennea panhai Páll-Gergely & Hunyadi, 2020
 Sinoennea perakensis (Godwin-Austen & G. Nevill, 1879)
 Sinoennea plagiostoma (Möllendorff, 1901)
 Sinoennea prima Panha & J. B. Burch, 1999
 Sinoennea pupoidea W.-C. Zhou, W.-H. Zhang & D.-N. Chen, 2009
 Sinoennea ranongensis Panha, 2005
 Sinoennea reischuetzorum Maassen, 2016
 Sinoennea ridley (Piele, 1926)
 Sinoennea shizhongshanensis J. Jiang, D.-N. Chen, X.-P. Wu & S. Ouyang, 2014
 Sinoennea stenopylis (Benson, 1860)
 Sinoennea strophiodes (Gredler, 1881)
 Sinoennea stunensis Dumrongrojwattana & Wongkamhaeng, 2013
 Sinoennea subcylindrica (Möllendorff, 1891)
 Sinoennea sumatrensis van Benthem Jutting, 1959
 Sinoennea sutchariti Páll-Gergely & Hunyadi, 2020
 Sinoennea tiarella van Benthem Jutting, 1961
 Sinoennea tweediei Tomlin, 1941
 Sinoennea vara (Benson, 1859)
 Sinoennea variabilis Páll-Gergely & Grego, 2020
 Sinoennea woodthorpei (Peile, 1929)
 Sinoennea yonakunijimana (Pilsbry & Hirase, 1909)
 Sinoennea ziminae H.-F. Yang, Z.-Y. Fan, D.-D. Qiao & J. He, 2012

Species brought into synonymy
 Sinoennea aliena (Bavay & Dautzenberg, 1912): synonym of Nagyelma aliena (Bavay & Dautzenberg, 1912) (unaccepted combination)
 Sinoennea beddomei (W. T. Blanford, 1881): synonym of Rowsonia beddomei (W. T. Blanford, 1881) (unaccepted combination)
 Sinoennea bongi Dance, 1970: synonym of Bruggennea bongi (Dance, 1970) (original combination)
 Sinoennea canarica (W. T. Blanford, 1881): synonym of Rowsonia canarica (W. T. Blanford, 1881) (unaccepted combination)
 Sinoennea chatasensis Tomlin, 1941: synonym of Sinoennea charasensis Tomlin, 1941 (incorrect original spelling)
 Sinoennea demangei (Bavay & Dautzenberg, 1912): synonym of Parasinoennea demangei (Bavay & Dautzenberg, 1912) (unaccepted combination)
 Sinoennea exilis (W. T. Blanford, 1881): synonym of Platylennea exilis (W. T. Blanford, 1881) (unaccepted combination)
 Sinoennea fargesiana (Heude, 1890): synonym of Sinoennea fuchsi (Gredler, 1885) (junior synonym)
 Sinoennea formica (Bavay & Dautzenberg, 1912): synonym of Parasinoennea formica (Bavay & Dautzenberg, 1912) (unaccepted combination)
 Sinoennea laidlawi Dance, 1970: synonym of Bruggennea laidlawi (Dance, 1970) (original combination)
 Sinoennea levis Peile, 1935: synonym of Platylennea levis (Peile, 1935) (original combination)
 Sinoennea longtanensis S. Ouyang, X.-M. Liu & X.-P. Wu, 2012: synonym of Parasinoennea splendens (Möllendorff, 1882) (junior synonym)
 Sinoennea macrodon (W. T. Blanford, 1881): synonym of Platylennea macrodon (W. T. Blanford, 1881) (unaccepted combination)
 Sinoennea microstoma (Möllendorff, 1881): synonym of Elma microstoma (Möllendorff, 1881) (unaccepted combination)
 Sinoennea ovulum (Bavay & Dautzenberg, 1912): synonym of Parasinoennea ovulum (Bavay & Dautzenberg, 1912) (unaccepted combination)
 Sinoennea pirriei (L. Pfeiffer, 1855): synonym of Rowsonia pirriei (L. Pfeiffer, 1855) (unaccepted combination)
 Sinoennea planguncula (Benson, 1863): synonym of Pupennea planguncula (W. H. Benson, 1863) (unaccepted combination)
 Sinoennea sculpta (W. T. Blanford, 1869): synonym of Rowsonia sculpta (W. T. Blanford, 1869) (unaccepted combination)
 Sinoennea siputana Tomlin, 1938: synonym of Sinoennea subcylindrica (Möllendorff, 1891) (junior synonym)
 Sinoennea splendens (Möllendorff, 1882): synonym of Parasinoennea splendens (Möllendorff, 1882) (unaccepted combination)
 Sinoennea subcostulata (W. T. Blanford, 1881): synonym of Platylennea subcostulata (W. T. Blanford, 1881) (unaccepted combination)
 Sinoennea turricula (W. T. Blanford, 1899): synonym of Rowsonia turricula (W. T. Blanford, 1899) (unaccepted combination)

References

External links
 
 Kobelt, W. (1904). Die systematische Stellung der chinesischen Ennea. Nachrichtsblatt der Deutschen Malakozoologischen Gesellschaft. 36: 26–30
 Kobelt, W. (1904-1905). Die Raublungenschnecken (Agnatha). Erste Abtheilung: Rhytididae & Enneidae. In: Kobelt, W., Ed. Systematisches Conchylien-Cabinet von Martini und Chemnitz. Neu herausgegeben und vervollständigt. Ersten Bandes, zwölfte Abtheilung (B). Erste Hälfte. (1) 12b: 80-296, pls 14-41. Nürnberg: Bauer & Raspe (publication dates: 80-296, pls 14-35 [1904; 297-362, pls 36-41]
  Páll-Gergely, B., Hunyadi, A., Grego, J., Sajan, S., Tripathy, B. & Chen, Z.-Y. (Zheyu). (2020). A review of the Diapheridae (Gastropoda: Eupulmonata: Streptaxoidea), with special emphasis on India and Myanmar. Raffles Bulletin of Zoology. 68: 682–718

Diapheridae
Invertebrates of Malaysia